St Brendan's Hospital is a hospital in Castlebay on the island of Barra, Eileanan Siar. It is managed by NHS Western Isles.

History
The current facility, which was originally staffed by nuns from the Society of the Sacred Heart as well qualified nurses, was opened in September 1980. In April 2018 NHS Western Isles announced that it intended to replace the current aging facility which it described as "completely unacceptable".

Services
The present facility comprises a 10-bedroom care home and five-bed hospital.

References

External links 
 
 Healthcare Improvement Scotland inspection reports

NHS Western Isles
NHS Scotland hospitals
Hospitals in the Outer Hebrides